John "Larry" Mitchell Jr. (born October 18, 1954) is an American politician. He is a Democratic member of the Delaware House of Representatives, representing District 13. He was elected in 2006 after the retirement of Democrat John F. Van Sant. In 2019, he was elected majority whip in the House.

Mitchell graduated from the New Castle County Police and Delaware State Police academies, and attended Delaware Technical Community College and the University of Delaware.

Electoral history
In 2006, Mitchell won the three-way Democratic primary with 375 votes (41.6%), and went on to win the general election with 3,126 votes (59.6%) against Republican nominee John Jaremchuk.
In 2008, Mitchell won the general election with 6,547 votes (96.1%) against Blue Enigma Party candidate Jeffrey Brown, who was simultaneously running for governor.
In 2010, Mitchell won the general election with 4,345 votes (90.8%) in a rematch against Jeffrey Brown.
In 2012, Mitchell was unopposed for the general election, winning 7,384 votes.
In 2014, Mitchell was unopposed for the general election, winning 3,258 votes.
In 2016, Mitchell was unopposed for the general election, winning 7,287 votes.
In 2018, Mitchell was unopposed for the general election, winning 5,528 votes.

References

External links
Official page at the Delaware General Assembly
 

1954 births
Living people
Democratic Party members of the Delaware House of Representatives
21st-century American politicians
University of Delaware alumni
People from Wilmington, Delaware